"Too Much Water" is a song written by George Jones and Sonny James. Jones released it as a single on the short-lived Mercury-Starday label in 1957, and it became a hit, peaking at No. 13 on the charts. Like most of Jones's singles to this point, "Too Much Water" was an up tempo honky tonk number in the Ernest Tubb-Hank Williams tradition, although with a slight rockabilly edge. The song was included on the 1957 LP 14 Top Country Favorites.

Discography 
 

1957 songs
George Jones songs
Songs written by George Jones
Song recordings produced by Pappy Daily
Starday Records singles